Monism attributes oneness or singleness (Greek: μόνος) to a concept, e.g. existence. Various kinds of monism can be distinguished:
 Priority monism states that all existing things go back to a source that is distinct from them; e.g., in Neoplatonism everything is derived from The One. In this view only the One is ontologically basic or prior to everything else.
 Existence monism posits that, strictly speaking, there exists only a single thing, the universe, which can only be artificially and arbitrarily divided into many things. 
 Substance monism asserts that a variety of existing things can be explained in terms of a single reality or substance. Substance monism posits that only one kind of substance exists, although many things may be made up of this substance, e.g., matter or mind.
 Dual-aspect monism is the view that the mental and the physical are two aspects of, or perspectives on, the same substance.
 Neutral monism believes the fundamental nature of reality to be neither mental nor physical; in other words it is "neutral".

Definitions
There are two sorts of definitions for monism:
 The wide definition: a philosophy is monistic if it postulates unity of the origin of all things; all existing things return to a source that is distinct from them.
 The restricted definition: this requires not only unity of origin but also unity of substance and essence.

Although the term monism is derived from Western philosophy to typify positions in the mind–body problem, it has also been used to typify religious traditions. In modern Hinduism, the term "absolute monism" is used for Advaita Vedanta.

History
The term monism was introduced in the 18th century by Christian von Wolff in his work Logic (1728), to designate types of philosophical thought in which the attempt was made to eliminate the dichotomy of body and mind and explain all phenomena by one unifying principle, or as manifestations of a single substance.

The mind–body problem in philosophy examines the relationship between mind and matter, and in particular the relationship between consciousness and the brain. The problem was addressed by René Descartes in the 17th century, resulting in Cartesian dualism, and by pre-Aristotelian philosophers, in Avicennian philosophy, and in earlier Asian and more specifically Indian traditions.

It was later also applied to the theory of absolute identity set forth by Hegel and Schelling. Thereafter the term was more broadly used, for any theory postulating a unifying principle. The opponent thesis of dualism also was broadened, to include pluralism. According to Urmson, as a result of this extended use, the term is "systematically ambiguous".

According to Jonathan Schaffer, monism lost popularity due to the emergence of analytic philosophy in the early twentieth century, which revolted against the neo-Hegelians. Rudolf Carnap and A. J. Ayer, who were strong proponents of positivism, "ridiculed the whole question as incoherent mysticism".

The mind–body problem has reemerged in social psychology and related fields, with the interest in mind–body interaction and the rejection of Cartesian mind–body dualism in the identity thesis, a modern form of monism. Monism is also still relevant to the philosophy of mind, where various positions are defended.

Types

Different types of monism include:
 Substance monism, "the view that the apparent plurality of substances is due to different states or appearances of a single substance"
 Attributive monism, "the view that whatever the number of substances, they are of a single ultimate kind"
 Partial monism, "within a given realm of being (however many there may be) there is only one substance"
 Existence monism, "the view that there is only one concrete object token (The One, "Τὸ Ἕν" or the Monad)"
 Priority monism, "the whole is prior to its parts" or "the world has parts, but the parts are dependent fragments of an integrated whole"
 Property monism, "the view that all properties are of a single type (e.g., only physical properties exist)" 
 Genus monism, "the doctrine that there is a highest category; e.g., being"

Views contrasting with monism are:
 Metaphysical dualism, which asserts that there are two ultimately irreconcilable substances or realities such as Good and Evil, for example, Manichaeism. 
 Metaphysical pluralism, which asserts three or more fundamental substances or realities.
 Metaphysical nihilism, negates any of the above categories (substances, properties, concrete objects, etc.).

Monism in modern philosophy of mind can be divided into three broad categories:

Certain positions do not fit easily into the above categories, such as functionalism, anomalous monism, and reflexive monism. Moreover, they do not define the meaning of "real".

Monistic philosophers

Pre-Socratic
While the lack of information makes it difficult in some cases to be sure of the details, the following pre-Socratic philosophers thought in monistic terms:
 Thales: Water
 Anaximander: Apeiron (meaning 'the undefined infinite'). Reality is some, one thing, but we cannot know what.
 Anaximenes of Miletus: Air
 Heraclitus: Change, symbolized by fire (in that everything is in constant flux).
 Parmenides: Being or Reality is an unmoving perfect sphere, unchanging, undivided.

Post-Socrates
 Neopythagorians such as Apollonius of Tyana centered their cosmologies on the Monad or One.
 Stoics taught that there is only one substance, identified as God.
 Middle Platonism under such works as those by Numenius taught that the Universe emanates from the Monad or One.
 Neoplatonism is monistic. Plotinus taught that there was an ineffable transcendent god, 'The One,' of which subsequent realities were emanations. From The One emanates the Divine Mind (Nous), the Cosmic Soul (Psyche), and the World (Cosmos).

Modern

Monistic neuroscientists
 György Buzsáki
 Francis Crick
 Karl Friston
 Eric Kandel
 Mark Solms
 Rodolfo Llinas
 Ivan Pavlov
 Roger Sperry

Religion

Pantheism

Pantheism is the belief that everything composes an all-encompassing, immanent God, or that the universe (or nature) is identical with divinity. Pantheists thus do not believe in a personal or anthropomorphic god, but believe that interpretations of the term differ.

Pantheism was popularized in the modern era as both a theology and philosophy based on the work of the 17th-century philosopher Baruch Spinoza, whose Ethics was an answer to Descartes' famous dualist theory that the body and spirit are separate. Spinoza held that the two are the same, and this monism is a fundamental quality of his philosophy. He was described as a "God-intoxicated man," and used the word God to describe the unity of all substance. Although the term pantheism was not coined until after his death, Spinoza is regarded as its most celebrated advocate.

H. P. Owen claimed that

Pantheism is closely related to monism, as pantheists too believe all of reality is one substance, called Universe, God or Nature. Panentheism, a slightly different concept (explained below), however is dualistic. Some of the most famous pantheists are the Stoics, Giordano Bruno and Spinoza.

Panentheism

Panentheism differentiates itself from pantheism, which holds that the divine is synonymous with the universe.

In panentheism, there are two types of substance, "pan" the universe and God. The universe and the divine are not ontologically equivalent. God is viewed as the eternal animating force within the universe. In some forms of panentheism, the cosmos exists within God, who in turn "transcends", "pervades" or is "in" the cosmos.

While pantheism asserts that 'All is God', panentheism claims that God animates all of the universe, and also transcends the universe. In addition, some forms indicate that the universe is contained within God,  like in the Judaic concept of Tzimtzum. Much Hindu thought is highly characterized by panentheism and pantheism.

Paul Tillich has argued for such a concept within Christian theology, as has liberal biblical scholar Marcus Borg and mystical theologian Matthew Fox, an Episcopal priest.

Pandeism

It is therefore most particularly the belief that the creator of the universe actually became the universe, and so ceased to exist as a separate entity.

Through this synergy pandeism claims to answer primary objections to deism (why would God create and then not interact with the universe?) and to pantheism (how did the universe originate and what is its purpose?).

Indian religions

Characteristics
The central problem in Asian (religious) philosophy is not the body-mind problem, but the search for an unchanging Real or Absolute beyond the world of appearances and changing phenomena, and the search for liberation from dukkha and the liberation from the cycle of rebirth. In Hinduism, substance-ontology prevails, seeing Brahman as the unchanging real beyond the world of appearances. In Buddhism, process ontology is prevalent, seeing reality as empty of an unchanging essence.

Characteristic for various Asian religions is the discernment of levels of truth, an emphasis on intuitive-experiential understanding of the Absolute such as jnana, bodhi  and kensho, and an emphasis on the integration of these levels of truth and its understanding.

Hinduism

Vedanta

Vedanta is the inquiry into and systematisation of the Vedas and Upanishads, to harmonise the various and contrasting ideas that can be found in those texts. Within Vedanta, different schools exist: 
 Advaita Vedanta, absolute monism, of which Adi Shankara is the best-known representative;
 Vishishtadvaita, qualified monism, is from the school of Ramanuja;
 Shuddhadvaita, in-essence monism, is the school of Vallabha; 
 Dvaitadvaita, differential monism, is a school founded by Nimbarka; 
 Dvaita, dualism, is a school founded by Madhvacharya is probably the only Vedantic System that is opposed to all types of monism. It believes that God is eternally different from souls and matter in both form and essence.
 Achintya Bheda Abheda, a school of Vedanta founded by Chaitanya Mahaprabhu representing the philosophy of inconceivable one-ness and difference. It can be understood as an integration of the strict dualist (dvaita) theology of Madhvacharya and the qualified monism (vishishtadvaita) of Ramanuja.

Advaita Vedanta

Monism is most clearly identified in Advaita Vedanta, though Renard points out that this may be a western interpretation, bypassing the intuitive understanding of a nondual reality.

In Advaita Vedanta, Brahman is the eternal, unchanging, infinite, immanent, and transcendent reality which is the Divine Ground of all matter, energy, time, space, being, and everything beyond in this Universe. The nature of Brahman is described as transpersonal, personal and impersonal by different philosophical schools.

Advaita Vedanta gives an elaborate path to attain moksha. It entails more than self-inquiry or bare insight into one's real nature. Practice, especially Jnana Yoga, is needed to "destroy one's tendencies (vāasanā-s)" before real insight can be attained.

Advaita took over from the Madhyamika the idea of levels of reality. Usually two levels are being mentioned, but Shankara uses sublation as the criterion to postulate an ontological hierarchy of three levels:
  (paramartha, absolute), the absolute level, "which is absolutely real and into which both other reality levels can be resolved". This experience can't be sublated by any other experience.
  (vyavahara), or samvriti-saya (empirical or pragmatical), "our world of experience, the phenomenal world that we handle every day when we are awake". It is the level in which both jiva (living creatures or individual souls) and Iswara are true; here, the material world is also true.
  (pratibhashika, apparent reality, unreality), "reality based on imagination alone". It is the level in which appearances are actually false, like the illusion of a snake over a rope, or a dream.

Vaishnava

All Vaishnava schools are panentheistic and view the universe as part of Krishna or Narayana, but see a plurality of souls and substances within Brahman. Monistic theism, which includes the concept of a personal god as a universal, omnipotent Supreme Being who is both immanent and transcendent, is prevalent within many other schools of Hinduism as well.

Tantra

Tantra sees the Divine as both immanent and transcendent. The Divine can be found in the concrete world. Practices are aimed at transforming the passions, instead of transcending them.

Modern Hinduism

The colonisation of India by the British had a major impact on Hindu society. In response, leading Hindu intellectuals started to study western culture and philosophy, integrating several western notions into Hinduism. This modernised Hinduism, at its turn, has gained popularity in the west.

A major role was played in the 19th century by Swami Vivekananda in the revival of Hinduism, and the spread of Advaita Vedanta to the west via the Ramakrishna Mission. His interpretation of Advaita Vedanta has been called Neo-Vedanta. In Advaita, Shankara suggests meditation and Nirvikalpa Samadhi are means to gain knowledge of the already existing unity of Brahman and Atman, not the highest goal itself:

Vivekananda, according to Gavin Flood, was "a figure of great importance in the development of a modern Hindu self-understanding and in formulating the West's view of Hinduism." Central to his philosophy is the idea that the divine exists in all beings, that all human beings can achieve union with this "innate divinity", and that seeing this divine as the essence of others will further love and social harmony. According to Vivekananda, there is an essential unity to Hinduism, which underlies the diversity of its many forms. According to Flood, Vivekananda's view of Hinduism is the most common among Hindus today. This monism, according to Flood, is at the foundation of earlier Upanishads, to theosophy in the later Vedanta tradition and in modern Neo-Hinduism.

Buddhism

According to the Pāli Canon, both pluralism (nānatta) and monism (ekatta) are speculative views. A Theravada commentary notes that the former is similar to or associated with nihilism (ucchēdavāda), and the latter is similar to or associated with eternalism (sassatavada).

In the Madhyamaka school of Mahayana Buddhism, the ultimate nature of the world is described as Śūnyatā or "emptiness", which is inseparable from sensorial objects or anything else. That appears to be a monist position, but the Madhyamaka views – including variations like rangtong and shentong – will refrain from asserting any ultimately existent entity. They instead deconstruct any detailed or conceptual assertions about ultimate existence as resulting in absurd consequences. The Yogacara view, a minority school now only found among the Mahayana, also rejects monism.

Levels of truth

Within Buddhism, a rich variety of philosophical and pedagogical models can be found. Various schools of Buddhism discern levels of truth:
 The Two truths doctrine of the Madhyamaka
 The Three Natures of the Yogacara
 Essence-Function, or Absolute-relative in Chinese and Korean Buddhism
 The Trikaya-formule, consisting of 
 The Dharmakāya or Truth body which embodies the very principle of enlightenment and knows no limits or boundaries;
 The Sambhogakāya or body of mutual enjoyment which is a body of bliss or clear light manifestation;
 The Nirmāṇakāya or created body which manifests in time and space.

The Prajnaparamita-sutras and Madhyamaka emphasize the non-duality of form and emptiness: "form is emptiness, emptiness is form", as the heart sutra says. In Chinese Buddhism this was understood to mean that ultimate reality is not a transcendental realm, but equal to the daily world of relative reality. This idea fitted into the Chinese culture, which emphasized the mundane world and society. But this does not tell how the absolute is present in the relative world:

This question is answered in such schemata as the Five Ranks of Tozan, the Oxherding Pictures, and Hakuin's Four ways of knowing.

Sikhism 

Sikhism complies with the concept of Absolute Monism. Sikh philosophy advocates that all that our senses comprehend is an illusion; God is the ultimate reality. Forms being subject to time shall pass away. God's Reality alone is eternal and abiding. The thought is that Atma (soul) is born from, and a reflection of, ParamAtma (Supreme Soul), and "will again merge into it", in the words of the fifth guru of Sikhs, Guru Arjun Dev Ji, "just as water merges back into the water."

God and Soul are fundamentally the same; identical in the same way as Fire and its sparks. "Atam meh Ram, Ram meh Atam" which means "The Ultimate Eternal reality resides in the Soul and the Soul is contained in Him". As from one stream, millions of waves arise and yet the waves, made of water, again become water; in the same way all souls have sprung from the Universal Being and would blend again into it.

Abrahamic faiths

Judaism

Jewish thought considers God as separate from all physical, created things and as existing outside of time.

According to Maimonides, God is an incorporeal being that caused all other existence. According to Maimonides, to admit corporeality to God is tantamount to admitting complexity to God, which is a contradiction to God as the first cause and constitutes heresy. While Hasidic mystics considered the existence of the physical world a contradiction to God's simpleness, Maimonides saw no contradiction.

According to Hasidic thought (particularly as propounded by the 18th century, early 19th-century founder of Chabad, Shneur Zalman of Liadi), God is held to be immanent within creation for two interrelated reasons:
 A very strong Jewish belief is that "[t]he Divine life-force which brings [the universe] into existence must constantly be present ... were this life-force to forsake [the universe] for even one brief moment, it would revert to a state of utter nothingness, as before the creation ..."
 Simultaneously, Judaism holds as axiomatic that God is an absolute unity, and that he is perfectly simple, thus, if his sustaining power is within nature, then his essence is also within nature.

The Vilna Gaon was very much against this philosophy, for he felt that it would lead to pantheism and heresy. According to some this is the main reason for the Gaon's ban on Chasidism.

Christianity

Creator–creature distinction

Christians maintain that God created the universe ex nihilo and not from his own substance, so that the creator is not to be confused with creation, but rather transcends it. There is a movement of "Christian Panentheism". Even more immanent concepts and theologies are to be defined together with God's omnipotence, omnipresence and omniscience, due to God's desire for intimate contact with his own creation (cf. Acts 17:27). Another use of the term "monism" is in Christian anthropology to refer to the innate nature of humankind as being holistic, as usually opposed to bipartite and tripartite views.

Rejection of radical dualism

In On Free Choice of the Will, Augustine argued, in the context of the problem of evil, that evil is not the opposite of good, but rather merely the absence of good, something that does not have existence in itself. Likewise, C. S. Lewis described evil as a "parasite" in Mere Christianity, as he viewed evil as something that cannot exist without good to provide it with existence. Lewis went on to argue against dualism from the basis of moral absolutism, and rejected the dualistic notion that God and Satan are opposites, arguing instead that God has no equal, hence no opposite. Lewis rather viewed Satan as the opposite of Michael the archangel. Due to this, Lewis instead argued for a more limited type of dualism. Other theologians, such as Greg Boyd, have argued in more depth that the Biblical authors held a "limited dualism", meaning that God and Satan do engage in real battle, but only due to free will given by God, for the duration that God allows.

Isaiah 45:5–7 (KJV) says:

Theosis

In Roman Catholicism and Eastern Orthodoxy, while human beings are not ontologically identical with the Creator, they are nonetheless capable with uniting with his Divine Nature via theosis, and especially, through the devout reception of the Holy Eucharist. This is a supernatural union, over and above that natural union, of which St. John of the Cross says, "it must be known that God dwells and is present substantially in every soul, even in that of the greatest sinner in the world, and this union is natural." Julian of Norwich, while maintaining the orthodox duality of Creator and creature, nonetheless speaks of God as "the true Father and true Mother" of all natures; thus, he indwells them substantially and thus preserves them from annihilation, as without this sustaining indwelling everything would cease to exist.

Christian Monism

Some Christian theologians are avowed monists, such as Paul Tillich. Since God is he "in whom we live and move and have our being" (Book of Acts 17.28), it follows that everything that has being partakes in God.

Mormonism

Latter Day Saint theology also expresses a form of dual-aspect monism via materialism and eternalism, claiming that creation was ex materia (as opposed to ex nihilo in conventional Christianity), as expressed by Parley Pratt and echoed in view by the movement's founder Joseph Smith, making no distinction between the spiritual and the material, these being not just similarly eternal, but ultimately two manifestations of the same reality or substance.

Parley Pratt implies a vitalism paired with evolutionary adaptation noting, “these eternal, self-existing elements possess in themselves certain inherent properties or attributes, in a greater or less degree; or, in other words, they possess intelligence, adapted to their several spheres.”

Parley Pratt’s view is also similar to Gottfried Leibniz’s monadology, which holds that “reality consists of mind atoms that are living centers of force.” 

Brigham Young anticipates a proto-mentality of elementary particles with his vitalist view, “there is life in all matter, throughout the vast extent of all the eternities; it is in the rock, the sand, the dust, in water, air, the gases, and in short, in every description and organization of matter; whether it be solid, liquid, or gaseous, particle operating with particle.”

The LDS conception of matter is “essentially dynamic rather than static, if indeed it is not a kind of living energy, and that it is subject at least to the rule of intelligence.” 

John A. Widstoe held a similar, more vitalist view, that “Life is nothing more than matter in motion; that, therefore, all matter possess a kind of life… Matter… [is] intelligence… hence everything in the universe is alive.” However, Widstoe resisted outright affirming a belief in panpsychism.

Islam

Quran
Vincent Cornell argues that the Quran provides a monist image of God by describing reality as a unified whole, with God being a single concept that would describe or ascribe all existing things.

But most argue that Abrahamic religious scriptures, especially the Quran, see creation and God as two separate existences. It explains that everything has been created by God and is under his control, but at the same time distinguishes creation as being dependent on the existence of God.

Sufism

Some Sufi mystics advocate monism. One of the most notable being the 13th-century Persian poet Rumi (1207–73) in his didactic poem Masnavi espoused monism. Rumi says in the Masnavi,

Other Sufi mystics however, such as Ahmad Sirhindi, upheld dualistic Monotheism (the separation of God and the Universe).

The most influential of the Islamic monists was the Sufi philosopher Ibn Arabi (1165–1240). He developed the concept of 'unity of being' (Arabic: waḥdat al-wujūd), which some argue is a monistic philosophy. Born in al-Andalus, he made an enormous impact on the Muslim world, where he was crowned "the great Master". In the centuries following his death, his ideas became increasingly controversial. Ahmad Sirhindi criticised monistic understanding of 'unity of being', advocating the dualistic-compatible 'unity of witness' (Arabic: wahdat ash-shuhud), maintaining separation of creator and creation. Later, Shah Waliullah Dehlawi reconciled the two ideas maintaining that their differences are semantic differences, arguing that the universal existence (which is different in creation to creator) and the divine essence are different and that the universal existence emanates (in a non-platonic sense) from the divine essence and that the relationship between them is similar to the relationship between the number four and a number being even.

Shi'ism

The doctrine of waḥdat al-wujūd also enjoys considerable following in the rationalist philosophy of Twelver Shi'ism, with the most famous modern-day adherent being Ruhollah Khomeini.

Baháʼí Faith

Although the teachings of the Baháʼí Faith have a strong emphasis on social and ethical issues, there exist a number of foundational texts that have been described as mystical. Some of these include statements of a monist nature (e.g., The Seven Valleys and the Hidden Words). The differences between dualist and monist views are reconciled by the teaching that these opposing viewpoints are caused by differences in the observers themselves, not in that which is observed. This is not a 'higher truth/lower truth' position. God is unknowable. For man it is impossible to acquire any direct knowledge of God or the Absolute, because any knowledge that one has, is relative.

Non-dualism

According to nondualism, many forms of religion are based on an experiential or intuitive understanding of "the Real". Nondualism, a modern reinterpretation of these religions, prefers the term "nondualism", instead of monism, because this understanding is "nonconceptual", "not graspable in an idea".

To these nondual traditions belong Hinduism (including Vedanta, some forms of Yoga, and certain schools of Shaivism), Taoism, Pantheism, Rastafari, and similar systems of thought.

See also
 Cosmic pluralism
 Dialectical monism
 Henosis
 Holism
 Indefinite monism
 Material monism
 Monadology
 Monistic idealism
 Ontological pluralism
 Realistic monism
 Univocity of being

Notes

References

Sources

External links 

 

Catholic Encyclopedia - Monism
Hinduism's Online Lexicon – (search for Monism)
The Monist

 
Philosophy of religion
Metaphysical theories
Theory of mind
Spinozism